Seri Menanti Royal Mausoleum is a Negeri Sembilan royal mausoleum located in the royal town of Seri Menanti, Kuala Pilah District, Negeri Sembilan, Malaysia. This mausoleum is located next to the Tuanku Munawir Royal Mosque.

List of graves

Yang di-Pertuan Besar (King) graves
 Raja Melewar – The 1st Yam Tuan of Negeri Sembilan
 Raja Hitam – The 2nd Yam Tuan of Negeri Sembilan
 Raja Lenggang – The 3rd Yam Tuan of Negeri Sembilan
 Yam Tuan Raden – The 4th Yam Tuan of Negeri Sembilan
 Yam Tuan Imam – The 5th Yam Tuan of Negeri Sembilan
 Tuanku Antah – The 6th Yam Tuan of Negeri Sembilan/Sri Menanti
 Tuanku Muhammad Shah ibni Almarhum Tuanku Antah – The 7th Yang Di Pertuan Besar of Sri Menanti/Negeri Sembilan (died 1933)
 Tuanku Abdul Rahman ibni Almarhum Tuanku Muhammad – The 8th Yang Di Pertuan Besar Negeri Sembilan and 1st Yang di-Pertuan Agong (1957–60) (died 1960)
 Tuanku Munawir ibni Almarhum Tuanku Abdul Rahman – The 9th Yang di Pertuan Besar Negeri Sembilan (died 1967)
 Tuanku Jaafar ibni Almarhum Tuanku Abdul Rahman – The 10th Yang di Pertuan Besar Negeri Sembilan and 10th Yang di-Pertuan Agong (1994–99) (died 2008)Tunku Ampuan of Negeri Sembilan (Queen) graves
 Tunku Kurshiah binti Almarhum Tunku Besar Burhanuddin – 1st Raja Permaisuri Agong (1957–60) (died 1999) Tunku Ampuan Durah binti Almarhum Tunku Besar Burhanuddin – consort of Tuanku Munawir (1960–67) (died 1999)Royal family graves
 Tunku Besar Burhanuddin (died 1961) Tunku Laksamana Nasir (died 1976) Tunku Panglima Besar Abdullah – Chairman and founder of the Melewar Corporation (died 2008) Tunku Alif Hussein Saifuddin Al-Amin ibni Tuanku Muhriz (died: 2016) Tunku Deanna binti Almarhum Tuanku Munawir (died 2017)''

References

External links
 

Buildings and structures in Negeri Sembilan
Kuala Pilah District
Mausoleums in Malaysia